Derchigny is a former commune in the Seine-Maritime department in the Normandy region in north-western France. On 1 January 2016, it was merged into the new commune of Petit-Caux. The local name is Derchigny-Graincourt as the commune resulted from the merger of two former communes, Derchigny and Graincourt, in 1822.

Geography

Heraldry

Population

Places of interest
 The church of St.Martin, dating from the eighteenth century.
 The church of St. Valery, dating from the eleventh century.
 The eighteenth-century château de Wargemont (made famous by the owners, the Berard family, being patrons of Auguste Renoir).
 The château de Derchigny, dating from the eighteenth century.

See also
Communes of the Seine-Maritime department

References

Former communes of Seine-Maritime